Kim Tu-bong (16 February 1889 – March 1958 or later) was the first Chairman of the Workers' Party of North Korea (one of predecessor of today WPK, the other is Workers' Party of South Korea) from 1946 to 1949. He was known in Korean history as a linguist, scholar, revolutionary and politician. His most famous work was under Ju Sigyeong; later, after participating in the March 1st Movement, he with other Korean leaders of the time established a provisional government-in-exile in China, and because of his communist beliefs he played an important role in the early North Korean communist government.

He and other members of the Yan'an faction formed the New People's Party when they returned from exile. After the New People's Party merged into the Workers Party of North Korea (WPNK) in 1946 at the 1st WPNK Congress, he became WPNK Chairman. He was the first head of state (Chairman of the Presidium of the Supreme People's Assembly) of North Korea from 1948 to 1957. He is most remembered in South Korea for his efforts in establishing the Korean linguistic field and especially that of Hangul. Much of his work both political and linguistically was done while living in China with the exiled government of Korea. He is also known by his pen name Baekyeon. He was purged by Kim Il-sung in 1957.

Early childhood and education
Born on 2 February 1889, in South Korea's South Gyeongsang Province, near modern-day Pusan, he spent his early years being homeschooled during the time of imperial rule. He would move to Seoul at the age of 20 (1908) to attend both Geho School and Baechae School and in that same year graduate from Bogo High School. While he was in Seoul he would join the Korea Youth organization in 1913 and the following year (1914) leave Baechae School. He was also an editor for the  magazine.

Early linguistic work
After graduating from Bosungkobo (Bosung College) in 1908, Kim Tu-bong worked closely with a linguistics professor from Bosungkobo named Ju Sigyeong, who was at that time beginning his work in the study of Hangul, for which his name would later be known, as he would dedicate his life to bring it about (the Korean script made by King Sejong during the 15th century). He also worked as a teacher. In 1916 he spent a majority of his time working on compiling MalMoi, the first Korean dictionary.

Shanghai and the exiled Korean government

After the March 1st Movement (1 March 1919) he and other members of the independence club fled into China and in April 1919 set up a provisional government in Shanghai. During this time he was first exposed to Communism and eventually accepted it in 1920 after first supporting the Democratic Party. In 1924 he was entrusted with the department of children education and schooling where he served as the president and also taught both Korean and Korean History. After the Japanese invaded China he and other members of the Korean government in Shanghai fled to Yan'an, headquarters of the Chinese Communist Party, and there Kim would become the head of the independence club and became a very important figure in combining the conflicting views of both communist and democratic ideas.

Return home and the new government

The December following World War II and the Japanese's surrender (15 August 1945) Kim Tu-bong and other members returned to the then-divided Korea. Like many other Communist-minded people of the time, Kim Tu-bong and other Communist leaders took residence in what is now North Korea under the Soviet occupation. In February 1946 Kim Tu-bong became the chairman of the new People's Party. Later that year in August it merged to form the Workers' Party. He would become the chairman in 1948, though from the outset the real power was held by Premier Kim Il-sung. Kim Tu-bong designed the new flag that is still used in North Korea today in an effort to throw off what he saw as feudal rule.

Kim Il-sung became chairman of the Workers' Party after it merged with its southern counterpart in 1949, thus becoming in name as well as in fact the country's leader. In most Communist states, the party leader is understood to be the most powerful man in the country.

Disappearance and death
After the Korean War Kim Tu-bong had served his usefulness in the government, and, whether real or imagined, many scholars believe he had become a perceived threat to Kim Il-sung's dictatorship. Rumors began that it had to do with a scandal, as he had married a much younger woman later in life. Whatever the reason, he was purged in March 1958, accused of involvement in the 1956 August Faction Incident. Like many others of Kim Il-sung's political opponents, he disappeared with no records to indicate whether he had been sentenced to hard labor or exile. He is believed either to have been executed or to have died some time in the 1960s in internal exile.

See also
 Yanan faction
 Kim Il-sung
 Cold War
 North Korea
 Korean independence movement

References

Dae-Sook Suh. Kim Il Sung: The North Korean Leader. Columbia University Press, 1988. pg. 351
n.d. Kim Dubong (김두봉). Naver encolopidia. 20 November 2013. http://terms.naver.com/.

External links
 "Kim Tu-bong and Historical Linguistics" by Andrei Lankov

1889 births
Year of death unknown
Anti-revisionists
Korean communists
Korean independence activists
Chairmen of the Presidium of the Supreme People's Assembly
Heads of state of North Korea
New People's Party (Korea) politicians
North Korean atheists
Leaders of the Workers' Party of Korea and its predecessors
Members of the 1st Supreme People's Assembly
Members of the 2nd Supreme People's Assembly
Members of the 1st Central Committee of the Workers' Party of North Korea
Members of the 2nd Central Committee of the Workers' Party of Korea
Members of the 1st Political Committee of the Workers' Party of North Korea
Members of the 1st Standing Committee of the Workers' Party of North Korea
Members of the 2nd Political Committee of the Workers' Party of Korea
Members of the 2nd Standing Committee of the Workers' Party of Korea
Flag designers
Linguists from Korea
20th-century linguists